The Isaac Miller House, also known as the Miller House, is a historic home located at St. Joseph, Missouri.  It was built in 1859, and is a two-story, Classical Revival-style brick dwelling.

It was listed on the National Register of Historic Places in 1980.

References

Houses on the National Register of Historic Places in Missouri
Neoclassical architecture in Missouri
Houses completed in 1859
Houses in St. Joseph, Missouri
National Register of Historic Places in Buchanan County, Missouri